Macrouridae is a family of deep sea fish, a diverse and ecologically important group, which are part of the order of cod-like fish, the Gadiformes. The species in the Macrouridae are characterised by their large heads which normally have a single barbel on the chin, projecting snouts, and slender bodies that taper to whip-like tails, without an obvious caudal fin but what there is of the caudal fin is often confluent with the posterior dorsal and anal fins. There are normally two dorsal fins, the anterior dorsal fin is quite high, the posterior quite low but is longer and takes up a greater proportion of the fish's of the back, species in the subfamily Macrouroidinae have a single dorsal fin. The long anal fin is almost as long as the second dorsal fin is nearly as long as the posterior dorsal, and sometimes it is longer. The pelvic fin is inserted in the vicinity of the thorax and normally has 5-17 fin rays but are absent in Macrouroides. The body is covered in small scales and if they have a photophore, it is usually on the midline of the abdomen just in front of the anus. The bioluminescence of these fish is produced by symbiotic bioluminescent bacteria. The structure of the skull has been used to show their placing in the Gadiformes, but they differ from the typical cods in that they possess one stout spine in the anterior dorsal fin.

The species in this family are mainly benthopelagic, they are found at depths of 200–2000 m, they occur on the sea bed and have a wide distribution from the Arctic to the Antarctic.  The species in the Macrouridae normally live near the sea bed on the continental slope, however, some species are bathypelagic or mesopelagic, other species occur on the outer continental shelf. Their bodies are loose in texture rather than firm and they are weak swimmers. Some species are of commercial importance to fisheries.

Subfamilies
There are four subfamilies within the Macrouridae:

Bathygadinae: contains 2 genera and 26 species 
Macrourinae: contains 28 genera and 370 species
Macrouroidinae: contains 2 monotypic genera 
Trachyrincinae contains 2 genera and 7 species

References

 
Gadiformes
Taxa named by Charles Lucien Bonaparte